Pleasant Grove is an unincorporated community in Woodruff County, Arkansas, United States.

References

Unincorporated communities in Woodruff County, Arkansas
Unincorporated communities in Arkansas